Danielle de Picciotto is an American-born artist, musician and filmmaker. She was born in Tacoma, Washington, USA,. She currently lives and works in Berlin, Germany. In 1989 she founded, along with her partner Dr. Motte, the first Berlin Love Parade.

Biography
De Picciotto was the initiator of Berlin "Clubart Movement" in 1992. She was vocalist for Space Cowboys and The Ocean Club (with Gudrun Gut).
She created the exhibition and event series "Kunst oder König / in", to promote Berlin artists, DJs, and musicians.
She was a member of the Berlin art movement Pop Surrealism.
She sang for Die Haut together with Anita Lane, Nick Cave and Kid Congo Powers.

She married her longtime partner Alexander Hacke, bassist of Einstürzende Neubauten in 2008.

De Picciotto collaborates with the Goethe Institut internationally on presenting Berlin's cultural scene and was commissioned by the German Foreign Ministry to direct a short film on European Club Culture in 2008. In 2012, she became a member of the band Crime & the City Solution.

She was featured as an important artist in the documentary In Berlin by Michael Ballhaus and Ciro Cappellari. 

In 2016, she was invited to do a course on interdisciplinary performance at the HfG at ZKM Center for Media Art in Karlsruhe. Panels and talks have also been also offered at NYU, Berlin and the Folkwang University, Bochum.

Discography and Other Released Media

Released Records and Singles

Space Cowboys 
 1991 Locked And Loaded (LP) 
 1993 Terrorist (Single)

Ocean Club 

 1996 Pearl (LP)
 1996 Obsession (LP)

Collaborations with Alexander Hacke 

 2016 Perseverantia (CD/LP) 

 2017  Unity (CD/LP) 

 2018 Menetekel (CD/LP)
 2018  Joy (CD/LP)

Solo Albums 

2019: Deliverance (LP)
 2020: The Element of Love (LP)
2021: The Silver Threshold

Released Songs 
1995 Waiting Divamania; Digivalley
1992 Cheerio Malarias
1997 No Go Die Haut
2005 Nackte Hunde Mermer Records
2011 Hitman's Heel CD in cooperation with Alexander Hacke
2013 American Twilight CD with Crime & the City Solution from Mute records
2014 The Ministry of Wolves Album release in collaboration with Mick Harvey, Alexander Hacke, Paul Wallfisch
 2015 Tacoma (CD/MC/MP3), Solo LP Monika Enterprise (Monika82 / LC 01806)

Released Films and Music Videos 

 2001 Directed a music video for Einstürzende Neubauten's Alexander Hacke on his world recording tour of Sanctuary
 2002 La Ballade De John Massis music video for Fred Alpi -- Paris
 2002 Rock On music video for Martin Dean -- Berlin
 2002 Kleiner Dicker Junge music video for Electrocute  -- Los Angeles
 2004 Einstürzende Neubauten - on tour with neubauten.org   film documentary
 2006 Throbbing Gristle; Berlin film documentary
 2007  Director, The Mountains of Madness, with The Tiger Lillies and Alexander Hacke.
 2008 The Ship Of Fools DVD/CD film documentary and CD together with Alexander Hacke 
 2009 Sternentanz, director. An animated short on club culture commissioned by the German Foreign Ministry
 2009 In Berlin, Protagonist in the Berlin documentary by Michael Ballhaus and Ciro Cappellari
 2009 Do you love me as much as I love you, Protagonist in the Documentary on Nick Cave and the Bad Seeds by Iain Forsyth and Jane Pollard
 2010 How Long Is Now, Film documentary DVD
 2012 The Glasshouse, Film documentary DVD
 2015 Not Junk Yet- The Art of Lary, 7 Film Documentary

Released Books 

 2015  We Are Gypsies Now released in the US by AMOK books
 2012 The Beauty of Transgression - A Berlin Memoir Publisher: Gestalten Verlag
 2013 We are Gypsies Now - Der Weg ins Ungewisse Graphic Diary Publisher: Metrolit Verlag Berlin
 2020: Die Heitere Kunst der Rebellion, Graphic Novel, Published by Graf& Graf

Other Media 

 2002 Initiated Bada Bing, a music event series, together with partner Alexander Hacke
 2011 Invited to do a five-month art residency at the Meetfactory in Prague
 2014 Republik der Wölfe Theater music composed and performed live at Theater Dortmund together with Mick Harvey, Alexander Hacke, Paul Wallfisch

References

External links

 Official homepage

Living people
Artists from Tacoma, Washington
American women artists
Musicians from Tacoma, Washington
1965 births
Crime & the City Solution members
21st-century American women